Kingston Bus Terminal is the inter-city bus station in Kingston, Ontario, Canada. It is at 1175 John Counter Boulevard, adjoining the Kingston Transit head office and bus garage. This location is in the northern portion of Kingston near Highway 401, the main highway across Southern Ontario. The terminal has 4 bays to handle 4 buses at a time.

The station is open between 10:30 a.m. and 8:00 p.m. daily.  Coq-O-Bec Rotisserie Chicken is located within the terminal, and there is a Tim Hortons next door. Parking for cars is available at the front the building, and for buses to the rear.

Local buses operating in the area of the terminal are Kingston Transit Routes 2, 7, and 16.

The facility opened in 1992, replacing the old bus terminal located on Division Street south of the 401.

Bus services

Previous terminals

Colonial Coach Lines initially operated from a garage at Queen and Bagot streets in 1926. In 1931, a new terminal was built behind the Windsor Hotel at Princess and Montreal Streets. In 1947, the terminal moved to a new building off the traffic circle at Bath Road and Princess, which included a restaurant and waiting room. In 1972, what was by then Voyageur Colonial Bus Lines  relocated to a terminal at Division Street just south of  Counter, close to Highway 401. That building is now the Portuguese Cultural Centre.

See also
 Kingston station - Kingston's train station
 Kingston Norman Rogers Airport

References

External links

 Busbud - Kingston Bus Terminal

Bus stations in Ontario
Transport in Kingston, Ontario
Buildings and structures in Kingston, Ontario
Transport infrastructure completed in 1992
1992 establishments in Ontario